Thomas Alfred "Alf" Budd (1 August 1922 – 8 March 1989) was a New Zealand rugby union player. A lock, Budd represented  at a provincial level, and was a member of the New Zealand national side, the All Blacks, for one match in each of  1946 and 1949.

Both of his appearances for the All Blacks were Test matches against Australia. In the 1946 match, New Zealand captained by Fred Allen won 14-10 but in the 1949 match the All Blacks led by Johnny Smith lost 9-16.

Budd featured in the Southland team in the 1940s and 50s who held the Ranfurly Shield and had victories over international teams.

Budd died in Whangarei on 8 March 1989, and he was buried at Onerahi Cemetery.

On Thursday 23 June 2022, there was a special presentation of an All Black cap for Alf Budd was held at the All Blacks training camp in Northland, attended by his son Leicester and daughter Margaret Keene 

Alf is not known to have been any relation to Alf Budd of Timaru who played for the All Blacks on the 1910 tour of Australia.

References

1922 births
1989 deaths
People from Bluff, New Zealand
New Zealand rugby union players
New Zealand international rugby union players
Southland rugby union players
Rugby union locks
Rugby union players from Southland, New Zealand